Barshi Assembly constituency (246) is one of the 288 Vidhan Sabha (legislative assembly) constituencies of Maharashtra state, western India. This constituency is located in Solapur district.

Geographical scope
The constituency comprises Barshi taluka.

Representatives

Barshi Vidhansabha Constituency (1951–Present)

References

Assembly constituencies of Solapur district
Assembly constituencies of Maharashtra